The family Pliopithecidae is an extinct family of fossil catarrhines and members of the Pliopithecoidea superfamily. 

Their anatomy combined primitive features such as a small braincase, a long snout, and a tail. At the same time, they possessed more advanced features such as stereoscopic vision and ape-like teeth and jaws, clearly distinguishing them from monkeys.

Begun and Harrison divide the Pliopithecidae into subfamilies Pliopithecinae and Crouzeliinae. Dionysopithecinae are sometimes placed here as a subfamily, but Begun & Harrison place them in their own family, the Dionysopithecidae.

References

 The Illustrated Encyclopedia of the Prehistoric World page 434.

Miocene primates
Pliocene primates
Miocene extinctions
Prehistoric apes
†Pliopithecidae
Prehistoric mammal families